Markapur Road railway station (station code: MRK), is an Indian Railway station in Markapur of Prakasam district in Andhra Pradesh. It is situated on Nallapadu–Nandyal section and is administered by Guntur railway division of South Coast Railway zone. Electrification on Nallapadu–Cumbum part, where Markapur Road is located has been commissioned in 2017. It is one of the important station for the pilgrims of Srisailam and is selected as one of the station to be developed under Adarsh station scheme.

See also 
List of railway stations in India

References 

Railway stations in Prakasam district
Railway stations in Guntur railway division